Matthew R. LaGrassa (born January 27, 1993) is an American professional soccer player who currently plays for USL Championship club Sacramento Republic.

Career

College
LaGrassa grew up in Elk Grove, California, where he attended Pleasant Grove High School. He played four years of college soccer at Cal Poly University between 2012 and 2015, including a red-shirted year in 2011.

LaGrassa appeared for Premier Development League side Des Moines Menace in 2011 and 2012, and Ventura County Fusion in 2013, 2014 and 2015.

Professional
LaGrassa signed with United Soccer League side Sacramento Republic on January 20, 2016.

LaGrassa was announced as one of United Soccer League club Nashville SC's first signings on November 30, 2017. Following the 2021 season LaGrassa's contract option was declined by Nashville and he became a free agent.

On January 13, 2022, LaGrassa returned to his former club Sacramento Republic.

Career statistics

Club

References

External links
 
Cal Poly bio

1993 births
Living people
American soccer players
Association football midfielders
Cal Poly Mustangs men's soccer players
Des Moines Menace players
Nashville SC (2018–19) players
Reno 1868 FC players
Sacramento Republic FC players
Soccer players from California
Sportspeople from Elk Grove, California
FC Tulsa players
USL Championship players
USL League Two players
Ventura County Fusion players
Major League Soccer players